Budești ( or Budfalu,  or Budesht) is a commune in Maramureș County, Maramureș, Romania. It is composed of two villages, Budești and Sârbi (Szerfalva or Szerfalu).

The 17th century wooden church of Saint Nicholas, Budești Josani is one of eight Wooden Churches of Maramureș that UNESCO has listed as a World Heritage Site.

References

Communes in Maramureș County
Localities in Romanian Maramureș≠